Hugo Riesenfeld (January 26, 1879 – September 10, 1939) was an Austrian-American composer. As a film director, he began to write his own orchestral compositions for silent films in 1917, and co-created modern production techniques where film scoring serves an integral part of the action. Riesenfeld composed about 100 film scores in his career.

His most successful compositions were for Cecil B. DeMille's Joan the Woman (1917), The Ten Commandments (1923) and The King of Kings (1927); D. W. Griffith's Abraham Lincoln (1930); and the original scores to F. W. Murnau's Sunrise: A Song of Two Humans (1927) and Tabu (1931).

Life and work 
Born in Vienna, Riesenfeld's musical career began at the age of seven with a violin study at the Conservatory of the Gesellschaft der Musikfreunde in his city of birth, where he graduated at the age of 17 in piano, violin and composition degrees. He briefly played in the Vienna Philharmonic. By the end of the 19th century, he was playing with Arnold Schönberg, Arthur Bodanzky, and Edward Falck in a local string quartet.

In 1907, Riesenfeld emigrated to New York City, where he worked until 1911 as concert-master for Oscar Hammerstein's Manhattan Opera Company. He served three seasons as conductor of musical comedy companies for Klaw & Erlanger, followed by a stint as concertmaster and conductor at the Century Opera. He did his first work in film when he conducted the accompaniment for Jesse L. Lasky's production of Carmen (1915).

Samuel Lionel Rothafel—later known as "Roxy" Rothafel—hired Riesenfeld in 1916 as conductor of, successively, the Rialto, the Rivoli, and the Criterion theatres until 1925, introducing the practice of long-run resident film musicians. These cinemas were among the first where runs of longer than a week became commonplace. In 1923, an article about Riesenfeld stated, "occasionally ten weeks the same piece with undiminished force – so knows he his audience" in a New York City article wrote the Viennese magazines about Riesenfeld. "He says, know the audience and know what you must show him, ever the secret of success at the theater and cinema." [...] "just customize and know what's there and what 'draws'."

Phonofilm and Red Seal Pictures
On 15 April 1923, with inventor Lee de Forest, Riesenfeld co-presented a show at the Rivoli Theater in New York City of 18 short films made in the Phonofilm sound-on-film process.

In 1923, Riesenfeld formed The Red Seal Pictures Corporation, partnered with Edwin Miles Fadiman, Dr. Lee deForest, and Max Fleischer to distribute American and foreign films through their chain of 36 theaters that extended as far as Cleveland, Ohio. In May 1926, Max Fleischer began producing a series of sound versions of their popular "Bouncing Ball" Song Car-Tunes, using the Lee de Forest Phonofilm sound-on-film process. Red Seal Pictures Corporation filed for bankruptcy in late 1926; shortly afterward, the DeForest Phonofilm Corporation filed for bankruptcy in September 1927.

Movie theaters and live orchestras
Most large movie theaters in the U.S. had their own orchestras for silent film accompaniment, with smaller theaters having just a theatre organ, photoplayer or piano. The musicians often relied on an already existing repertoire of opera and excerpts from other compositions. Riesenfeld began as one of the first to write original compositions for films. As an example, the "Brother's Theme" was a mainstay of the 1926 release of Beau Geste (published by Robbins-Engel Inc.).

Next to Albert William Ketèlbey and Ernö Rapée, Riesenfeld was a pioneer of modern, high-quality production of music. He also co-founded the cinema library music—topical collections of music for silent film orchestra and musicians also. "Mr. Riesenfeld puts much emphasis on the music in the movies", in an article about Riesenfeld and film music. "Orchestra with organ varies in its two large theatres. His organist gets $250 a week, 70 orchestra musicians are well-paid because the lowest wage is 70 dollars a week. [...] Of course, the business costs in America are quite different than ours. Mr. Riesenfeld explains that he must have a dose of 50,000 dollars per week to reach its expenses and to this purpose otherwise it zahle weekly 120,000 spectators as he. [...] News always appear in the first week in its theatres. [...] "Mr. Riesenfeld paid up to 6000 dollars a week for the presentation rights for a good movie."

When he wrote the music for the Western movie The Covered Wagon (1923), Riesenfeld was one of the most frequently employed film composers in Hollywood. From 1928 to 1930, he was General Music Director of United Artists. After that time, Riesenfeld worked mostly for independent productions.

Away from the film industry, he was orchestra conductor of the Los Angeles Symphony and as a composer in the classical sector. He composed the ballet Chopin's Dances (1905), the comic opera Merry Martyr (1913), the musical Betty Be Good (1921), Children's Suite (1928) and overtures, orchestral music, and songs.

Illness and death 
Riesenfeld died in 1939 in Los Angeles after a severe illness. His daughter Janet starred in some Mexican movies as a dancer and actress under the pseudonym Raquel Rojas and Janet Alcorzia and later became a screenwriter.

Filmography 

A selection of film compositions, unless otherwise noted:

 1915: Carmen (as conductor) directed by Raoul Walsh
 1917: Joan the Woman directed by Cecil B. DeMille
 1918: A Christmas Fantasy (producer, director) short film
 1919: Sahara directed by Arthur Rosson
 1920: Humoresque directed by Frank Borzage
 1921: La Tosca (new composition) directed by Edward José
 1921: Reputation directed by Stuart Paton
 1923: The Ten Commandments directed by Cecil B. DeMille
 1923: The Covered Wagon directed by James Cruze
 1923: The Hunchback of Notre Dame directed by Wallace Worsley
 1925: Beggar on Horseback directed by James Cruze
 1925: The Wanderer directed by Raoul Walsh
 1926: The Volga Boatman directed by Cecil B. DeMille
 1926: Old Ironsides directed by James Cruze
 1926: Beau Geste directed by Herbert Brenon
 1926: The Sorrows of Satan directed by D. W. Griffith
 1927: Chang directed by Merian C. Cooper and Ernest B. Schoedsack
 1927: Sunrise: A Song of Two Humans directed by F. W. Murnau
 1927: The Cat and the Canary directed by Paul Leni
 1927: The King of Kings directed by Cecil B. DeMille
 1927: Uncle Tom's Cabin directed Harry A. Polard
 1927: Old San Francisco directed by Alan Crosland
 1928: The Battle of the Sexes directed by D. W. Griffith)
 1928: The Cavalier directed by Irvin Willat
 1928: The Awakening directed by Victor Fleming
 1928: Two Lovers directed by Fred Niblo
 1928: Looping the Loop directed by Arthur Robison
 1929: Lucky Boy directed by Norman Taurog and Charles C. Wilson
 1929: Condemned directed by Wesley Ruggles
 1929: Bulldog Drummond directed by F. Richard Jones
 1929: The Iron Mask directed by Allan Dwan
 1929: Eternal Love directed by Ernst Lubitsch
 1929: Coquette directed by Sam Taylor
 1930: Abraham Lincoln directed by D. W. Griffith
 1930: Hell's Angels (Höllenflieger) directed by Howard Hughes
 1931: Tabu directed by F. W. Murnau
 1932: White Zombie directed by Victor Halperin
 1933: The Wandering Jew directed by Maurice Elvey
 1934: The President Vanishes directed by William Wellman
 1934: Little Men directed by Phil Rosen
 1935: The Phantom Empire (serial) directed by Otto Brower and B. Reeves Eason
 1935: Hard Rock Harrigan (music arranger) directed by David Howard
 1936: Robinson Crusoe of Clipper Island (serial) directed by Ray Taylor and Mack V. Wright
 1936: Daniel Boone (stock music) directed by David Howard
 1937: The Painted Stallion (serial) directed by Alan James, Ray Taylor, and William Witney
 1937: Make a Wish (music department) directed by Kurt Neumann
 1938: Tarzan's Revenge directed by D. Ross Lederman
 1938: Wide Open Faces directed by Kurt Neumann

Posthumous works:
 1940: The Return of Frank James (stock music) directed by Fritz Lang
 2003: The Making of 'The Last Man''' (short documentary) directed by Luciano Berriatúa

Awards:
 1938: Oscar nomination for best score for Make a Wish''

Notes

External links 

 
 

1879 births
1939 deaths
19th-century Austrian people
20th-century Austrian people
19th-century classical violinists
American male violinists
20th-century classical violinists
19th-century conductors (music)
20th-century American conductors (music)
19th-century classical composers
20th-century classical composers
American classical violinists
Male classical violinists
Concertmasters
Male conductors (music)
American male conductors (music)
American film score composers
American male film score composers
Austro-Hungarian emigrants to the United States
American people of Austrian-Jewish descent
Austrian Jews
Musicians from Vienna
19th-century American composers
20th-century American composers
20th-century American male musicians
20th-century American violinists